George Anthony "Dandy" Woodend (December 9, 1917 – May 1, 1980) was a professional baseball pitcher. He appeared in three games in Major League Baseball with the Boston Braves in 1944.

Woodend was recruited out of a Hartford, Connecticut high school by the Philadelphia Athletics. Immediately following graduation in 1937, he was scheduled to report to the Athletics, where he said they would send him to Temple University. He attended spring training with the A's in 1938, but was soon optioned to the Minor League Baseball Class A Williamsport Grays.

References

External links

Major League Baseball pitchers
Boston Braves players
Lexington Indians players
Newton-Conover Twins players
Goldsboro Goldbugs players
Mayodan Millers players
Hartford Bees players
Syracuse Chiefs players
Los Angeles Angels (minor league) players
Baseball players from Hartford, Connecticut
1917 births
1980 deaths